Anna Melnikova (born ) is a Russian female volleyball player.

With her club Dinamo Kazan she competed at the 2014 FIVB Volleyball Women's Club World Championship.

References

External links
 profile at FIVB.org

1995 births
Living people
Russian women's volleyball players
Place of birth missing (living people)
Saratov State Agrarian University alumni
20th-century Russian women
21st-century Russian women